The Viale 35 hp was a five-cylinder, air-cooled, radial engine for aircraft use designed and built in France by the Italian engine designer Spirito Mario Viale, that was first run around 1910. It developed 35 horsepower (26 kW). Three- and seven-cylinder variants of the same engine were built, although little is known about them.

Applications
Bristol Babe
Avro Type D
Avro Type F

Engines on display
A preserved Viale 35 hp engine is on display at the Science museum in London. This engine is believed to be the unit that powered the sole example of the Avro Type F and was later used in the prototype  Bristol Babe designed by Frank Barnwell.

Specifications (Viale 35 hp)

See also

References

Notes

Bibliography

 Lumsden, Alec. British Piston Engines and their Aircraft. Marlborough, Wiltshire: Airlife Publishing, 2003. .

External links

Flight, October 1912 - Image of the Viale 35 hp installed in the Avro Type F monoplane

1910s aircraft piston engines
Aircraft air-cooled radial piston engines